Guru Nanak College, Dhanbad is an educational centre located in Dhanbad, Jharkhand, India, offering undergraduate, vocational, and add-on courses.

Courses

Undergraduate courses 
 B.A. Economics Honours
 B.A. English Honours
 B.A. Hindi Honours
 B.A. History Honours
 B.A. Political Science Honours
 B.A. Psychology Honours
 B.Com. Accountancy Honours
 B.A. (General)
 I.A.
 I.Com.

Vocational courses 
 B.C.A (three-year programme)
 B.Ed.

Add-on courses 
 Certificate courses in computing
 Certificate course in communicative English

Activities 
 NSS
 NCC
 Creativity

Accreditation 
G,N College was awarded a 'B' grade by the National Assessment and Accreditation Council (NAAC).

References

Colleges affiliated to Binod Bihari Mahto Koyalanchal University
Universities and colleges in Jharkhand
Education in Dhanbad